Nimbacinus richi lived during the middle Miocene and has been found in deposits in Bullock Creek in the Northern Territory of Australia.

Nimbacinus richi is distinguished from Nimbacinus dicksoni by a well-preserved holotype of a right dentary.
The species was a carnivorous, quadrupedal marsupial in Australia. In appearance it resembled a dog with a long snout. Its molar teeth were specialized for carnivory; the cups and crest were reduced or elongated to give the molars a cutting blade.

Taxonomy 
The description of the species was published in 2000 by researchers Peter F. Murray, working at the Museum of Central Australia and Dirk Megirian of the Northern Territory Museum.
The holotype is fossilised material excavated at "Top Site" at the Bullock Creek fossil area, a partial left dentary with a premolar and several molars that is dated to the mid-Miocene.
The specific epithet commemorates Tom Rich, who introduced the authors to the site of their discovery.

Description 
A mid-sized thylacinid of the genus Nimbacinus.

References

External links

Natural Worlds
MURRAY. P AND MEGIRIAN. D., Two new genera and three new species of Thylacinidae (Marsupialia) from the Miocene of the Northern Territory, Australia

Prehistoric thylacines
Prehistoric mammals of Australia
Miocene marsupials